Okhlebinino is a rural locality (a selo) and the administrative centre of Okhlebininsky Selsoviet, Iglinsky District, Bashkortostan, Russia. The population was 924 as of 2010. There are 19 streets.

Geography 
Okhlebinino is located 44 km south of Iglino (the district's administrative centre) by road. Muksinovo is the nearest rural locality.

References 

Rural localities in Iglinsky District